Changwon NC Park is a baseball stadium in Changwon, South Korea. The stadium replaced the nearby Masan Baseball Stadium as the home of KBO club NC Dinos. The stadium was designed by architecture firm Populous and hosted its first game on March 23, 2019.

References

Baseball venues in South Korea
Sports venues in Changwon
NC Dinos
Sports venues completed in 2019
2019 establishments in South Korea